Taunggyi University, located in Taunggyi, is the main university in Shan State, Myanmar. The university offers bachelor's and master's degree programs in  arts and sciences.

History
Taunggyi College was established on 15 June 1961 as an affiliated college of Mandalay University. Per the University Education Act of 1964, it became Taunggyi Degree College, still under the purview of Mandalay University. It became an independent university on 17 August 1992, drawing most of its students from Shan State.

Programs
Taunggyi University's main offerings are Bachelor of Arts and Bachelor of Science degrees although it reportedly also offers some master's and doctorate level degrees.

References

Universities and colleges in Shan State
Arts and Science universities in Myanmar
Universities and colleges in Myanmar
Buildings and structures in Shan State